Nicoleta Cătălina Dascălu (born 19 December 1995) is a Romanian professional tennis player.

Dascălu has career-high WTA rankings of No. 266 in singles and 240 in doubles. She has won five singles titles and four doubles titles on the ITF Women's Circuit.

Dascălu made her WTA Tour main-draw debut at the 2016 Bucharest Open, in the doubles competition, partnering Irina Bara.

ITF Circuit finals

Singles: 8 (5 titles, 3 runner–ups)

Doubles: 12 (4 titles, 8 runner–ups)

References

External links
 
 

1995 births
Living people
Romanian female tennis players
Sportspeople from Pitești